Andrew Neel is an American filmmaker, known as the creator of the films Darkon, New World Order and King Kelly.

Early life
Andrew Neel was born in Vermont in 1978. He is the grandson of the visual artist Alice Neel. He attended Northfield Mount Hermon high school in Massachusetts, where he lived in the C-1 dorm with Nick Vida, and was a member of the student disciplinary committee.

Career
Neel founded SeeThink Films with Ethan Palmer, Luke Meyer and Tom Davis in 2001 after graduating from Columbia College with a BA in film studies. He has directed six feature-length films: Darkon, Alice Neel, The Feature, New World Order, King Kelly, and Goat.

Awards 
Neel's first film, Darkon, won the Audience Award at the South by Southwest Film Festival and was acquired by IFCtv. The film was optioned for narrative fiction re-make by Paramount via Plan B Entertainment, which was to be written by John Hodgman. Neel's second film, Alice Neel, was acquired by Art House Films and is currently airing on the Sundance Channel. It won the Audience Award at the Newport Beach Film Festival. His third film, The Feature, premiered at the Berlin International Film Festival in 2008 and won the New Visions Award at the Copenhagen International Documentary Festival. It screened at MOMA in 2009. Also that year, Neel co-directed New World Order (2009) which was produced by IFCtv. In 2012 Neel directed his first feature narrative film, King Kelly and produced Stand Clear of the Closing Doors (2013).

Filmography as director 
 Darkon
 Alice Neel
 The Feature
 New World Order
 King Kelly
 Goat (2016)

References

External links 
 
 
 SeeThink Films website

American film directors
Living people
Year of birth missing (living people)
Columbia College (New York) alumni
Northfield Mount Hermon School alumni